Nataliya Bozhenova (born 15 January 1969) is a former Ukrainian volleyball player, who played as a middle-blocker.

She was part of the Ukraine women's national volleyball team at the 1996 Summer Olympics. 
She also competed at the 2001 Women's European Volleyball Championship.
On club level she played for Teodora Ravenna in 2001.

References

External links
 http://www.todor66.com/volleyball/Olympics/Women_1996.html
 http://www.alamy.com/stock-photo-russias-lioubov-chachkova-r-smashes-the-ball-over-ukrainian-natalia-120359672.html
 
 
 

1969 births
Living people
Ukrainian women's volleyball players
Place of birth missing (living people)
Olympic volleyball players of Ukraine
Volleyball players at the 1996 Summer Olympics
Ukrainian expatriate sportspeople in Italy
Expatriate volleyball players in Italy